Thomas Arthur Wham (November 22, 1924December 25, 2006) was a professional American football defensive end for the Chicago Cardinals in the National Football League.

References

1924 births
2006 deaths
Sportspeople from Greenville, South Carolina
Players of American football from South Carolina
American football defensive linemen
Furman Paladins football players
Chicago Cardinals players
Eastern Conference Pro Bowl players